CORE may refer to:
 Center for Operations Research and Econometrics at the University of Louvain (UCLouvain) in Belgium
 Center for Organizational Research and Education
 CORE (research service), a research service at The Open University in Buckinghamshire, England
 Central Organisation for Railway Electrification, a subsidiary of Indian Railways
 Congress of Racial Equality (CORE)
 Coordenadoria de Recursos Especiais (Brazil), a SWAT unit 
 Committee on Operating Rules for Information Exchange, part of the Council for Affordable Quality Healthcare
 Caucus of Rand File Educators, a caucus of the Chicago Teachers Union
 Intel Core, stylized and marketed as Intel CORE as of 2009 
 Lutheran CORE, or Coalition for Renewal, a non-profit organization formed in 2005
 CORE Project (Curriculum Open-Access Resources in Economics Project)
 CORE (Clinical Outcomes in Routine Use) System and CORE System Trust, see CORE-OM
 The CORE, an area (the last subarea of Hotland) in the video game Undertale
"CORE", a track from the soundtrack of the 2015 video game Undertale by Toby Fox
 Collective Oregon Eateries, Portland, Oregon, U.S.
 CORE (Community Organized Relief Effort), Non-profit organization founded by Sean Penn and Ann Lee